Gijsbert Bos (born 22 February 1973) is a Dutch former professional footballer who played as a forward.

Club career
Bos played for hometown club IJsselmeervogels before moving abroad to play in the English Football League. He returned to Dutch amateur football in 1998.

He finished his career at Eemdijk in 2007.

References

External links

1973 births
Living people
People from Spakenburg
Dutch footballers
Association football forwards
IJsselmeervogels players
Lincoln City F.C. players
Gateshead F.C. players
Rotherham United F.C. players
Walsall F.C. players
SDC Putten players
English Football League players
Dutch expatriate footballers
Expatriate footballers in England
Dutch expatriate sportspeople in England
SV Huizen players
Footballers from Utrecht (province)